Florideophyceae is a class of red algae. They were once thought to be the only algae to bear pit connections, but these have since been found in the filamentous stage of the Bangiaceae. They were also thought only to exhibit apical growth, but there are genera known to grow by intercalary growth. Most, but not all, genera have three phases to the life cycle.

Classification

There are various classification schemes; see red algae.  One option is to use the following:

Subclass Hildenbrandiophycidae
 Hildenbrandiales

Subclass Nemaliophycidae
 Acrochaetiales
 Balbianiales
 Balliales
 Batrachospermales
 Colaconematales
 Nemaliales
 Palmariales
 Entwisleiales
 Thoreales

Subclass Corallinophycidae
 Corallinales
 Corallinapetrales
 Rhodogorgonales
 Sporolithales

The subclass Corallinophycidae was introduced in 2007.

Subclass Ahnfeltiophycidae
 Ahnfeltiales
 Pihiellales

Subclass Rhodymeniophycidae
 Bonnemaisoniales
 Ceramiales
 Gelidiales
 Gigartinales
 Gracilariales
 Halymeniales
 Nemastomatales
 Peyssonneliales
 Plocamiales
 Rhodymeniales
 Acrosymphytales
 Atractophorales
 Catenellopsidales
 Sebdeniales

According to molecular clock analysis, Florideophyceae diverged from other red algae about 943 (817–1,049) million years ago. It split into Hildenbrandiophycidae ca. 781 (681–879) mya, Nemaliophycidae ca. 661 (597–736) mya and Corallinophycidae ca. 579 (543–617) mya, and ca. 508 (442–580) mya the split between Ahnfeltiophycidae and Rhodymeniophycidae occurred.

References

External links
 Tree of Life: Florideophyceae